The 2021 European Judo Championships was held in Lisbon, Portugal from 16 to 18 April 2021.

Medal summary

Medal table

Men's events

Women's events

Participating nations
A total of 359 competitors from 45 nations participated.

References

External links
 
 Results

 
European Judo Championships
European Championships
European Championships 2021
Judo
Judo
Judo
Judo